Cambo-les-Bains is a town in the traditional Basque province of Labourd, now in the Pyrénées-Atlantiques department in south-western France. It lies on the south-western bank of the river Nive. Cambo-les-Bains station has rail connections to Saint-Jean-Pied-de-Port and Bayonne.

Population

People
In 1900, Edmond Rostand, writer of the play Cyrano de Bergerac, came to Cambo-les-Bains because of his pulmonary disease. He was taken by the area and in time bought some land and had a house built. It was completed in 1906.  His house, the Villa Arnaga, is now a heritage site and a museum devoted to Rostand's life and Basque architecture and crafts.

The Spanish composer Isaac Albéniz died in Cambo-les-Bains in 1909 as well as another significant Spanish composer, Sebastián Durón, who died there in 1716. The French orientalist Jean Sauvaget died in Cambo in 1950. Musical instrument inventor Georges Jenny, who devised the Ondioline, died in Cambo-les-Bains in 1975.

Mixel Labéguerie, a doctor and key figure in Basque culture and politics after World War II lived in Cambo. He was elected mayor of the town for three terms as of 1965, and most notably he is credited as the father figure of the 1960s Basque musical revival. He was also a founding member of the Basque nationalist movement Enbata. In 1980, his memorial service held in Cambo was attended by 4,000 people.

See also
Communes of the Pyrénées-Atlantiques department

References

External links

 KANBO in the Bernardo Estornés Lasa - Auñamendi Encyclopedia (Euskomedia Fundazioa) Information available in Spanish
 Edmond Rostand, Cambo-les-Bains Information about Rostand's house, now a museum, in French

Communes of Pyrénées-Atlantiques
Spa towns in France
Pyrénées-Atlantiques communes articles needing translation from French Wikipedia